Suryavanshi or Suryawanshi may refer to:

People 
 Suryavansha, a dynasty of ancient India
 Anand Suryavanshi (born 1957), Indian actor
 Digangana Suryavanshi (born 1997), Indian actress, singer, and author
 Sarjarao Suryavanshi (born 1926), Indian wrestler
 Narsingrao Suryawanshi (born 1952), Indian politician
 Ashish Suryawanshi (born 1990), Indian cricketer
 Chetan Suryawanshi (born 1985),Singaporean cricketer

Film 
 Suryavanshi (film), a 1992 Hindi-language Indian feature film
 Sooryavanshi, a 2021 Hindi-language Indian action film